Adolf Schlyssleder or Adolph Schlyssleder (1909–1995) was a German film editor and assistant director.  He also directed the 1942 comedy film Der Hochtourist. He spent his career working at the Bavaria Studios in his native Munich.

Selected filmography
 Manja Valewska (1936)
 Peterle (1943)
 Between Yesterday and Tomorrow (1947)
 The Millionaire (1947)
 The Lost Face (1948)
 Beloved Liar (1950)
 Everything for the Company (1950)
 Kissing Is No Sin (1950)
 The Crucifix Carver of Ammergau (1952)
 Marriage Strike (1953)
 The Monastery's Hunter (1953)
 Hubertus Castle (1954)
 Dear Miss Doctor (1954)
 School for Marriage (1954)
 Two Bavarians in the Harem (1957)
 Gräfin Mariza (1958)
 Mikosch, the Pride of the Company (1958)
 A Summer You Will Never Forget (1959)
 I Will Always Be Yours (1960)
 His Best Friend (1962)
 The Flying Classroom (1973)
 When Mother Went on Strike (1974)

References

Bibliography
 Fritz, Raimund. Oskar Werner - das Filmbuch. Filmarchiv Austria, 2002.
 Reichmann, Hans-Peter. Curd Jürgens. Henschel, 2007.

External links

1909 births
1995 deaths
German film editors
People from Munich